is a computer game developed and released in Japan by Wolf Team. Narumi Kakinouchi, co-creator of Vampire Princess Miyu, was the art director for this game. The music for the game was composed by Masaaki Uno, Motoi Sakuraba, and Yasunori Shiono.

See also
Arcus Odyssey

References

External links
 

1989 video games
Adventure games
Arcus (video game series)
Japan-exclusive video games
MSX2 games
Telenet Japan games
X68000 games
NEC PC-8801 games
NEC PC-9801 games
Video games developed in Japan
Video games scored by Motoi Sakuraba